Television in North Korea is subject to the Korean Central Broadcasting Committee and controlled by the Propaganda and Agitation Department of the Workers' Party of Korea. A study in 2017 found that 98% of households had a television set. As of 2020, there are over-the-air broadcasts in both analogue and recently launched digital formats.

Technological data 
Television in North Korea uses a PAL 576i Systems D and K analog signal transmission system and 4:3 aspect ratio. Before 1993, North Korea was operating on the SECAM television system, which also uses 576i at 4:3. The four major television channels—Korean Central Television, Mansudae, Athletic Television and Ryongnamsan—broadcast over the air, as well as on a cable television system in Pyongyang; these channels are also available in a special app found on the government issued Samjiyon tablet computers, as well as on the Manbang IPTV service.

North Korea uses DVB-T2 for Digital Terrestrial Television. Trials began in 2012. As of 2020, multiple set-top box models were available, giving access to the four broadcast channels.

Television sets sold in North Korea are able to operate only on the PAL and DVB-T2 systems, to prevent them from being able to pick up broadcasts from South Korea (which use NTSC System M analogue and ATSC digital) or China (which uses DTMB digital). However, broadcasts from Russia can be picked up, as they are also DVB-T2. Imported TV sets that are able to operate on both PAL and NTSC, such as those from Japan, have their NTSC abilities disabled by the government on import.

Television channels
As of August 16, 2016, there were four television channels in North Korea. All are state-owned and usually last from daytime to prime time.

Korean Central Television 

This is the oldest and main television channel in North Korea, and it started regular broadcasting in 1963. As of 2017, it is the only North Korean TV channel broadcasting to the outside world via satellite television and IPTV aside from domestic transmissions. On satellite, KCTV is available in standard definition as well as in Full HD. Since December 4, 2017, a test air broadcast in the format 16:9 SDTV was started.

Mansudae Television 

Mansudae Television broadcasts educational material with the occasional advert on weekends to Pyongyang. It opened on December 1, 1973. The Mansudae TV Broadcasting Station broadcasts three hours (19:00–22:00) on Saturdays, and nine hours (10:00–13:00, 16:00–22:00) on Sundays.

Ryongnamsan Television 

 ( is an educational channel provided by University Student TV Department of Korea Radio and Television. De facto the director of this channel is Yang Chun Won.

The channel started broadcasting on April 1, 1971, under the name "Kaesong". On October 10, 1991, that channel transitioned to color broadcasting. On 1 February 1997 (some sources say 16 February 1997), the channel was rebranded as the "Korean Educational and Cultural Network". According to the North Korea Handbook, the rebranding was connected with the 55th anniversary of Kim Jong-il. The channel was broadcast on Channel 9 in Pyongyang from 17:00 to 22:00 on weekdays and from 12:00 to 22:00 on weekends. Also in the 1990s, the television station carried out experimental broadcasting from the television tower in Kaesong on Channel 8 in the NTSC-M format, as a way to promote North Korean culture among South Korean viewers. Channel 8 was chosen to prevent the signal from being jammed by South Korean broadcasters, since in Seoul, Channels 7 and 9 were used for KBS2 and KBS1 until that country's analogue shutdown on December 31, 2012. KBS1 and KBS2 were also broadcast in the demilitarized zone on Channels 29 and 28, respectively, although their signal was jammed by the North Korean government.

On September 5, 2012, the channel received its current name. Its schedule includes science documentaries in English, television lectures and educational programs for learning foreign languages. The channel is available for viewing to students of all universities of Pyongyang. The station broadcasts on Channel 9 from the Pyongyang TV tower, on the Manbang IPTV service, and on apps on Samjiyon tablets.

Athletic Television 

 (Cheyug TV) is the sports channel launched on August 15, 2015. Athletic Television presents sports competitions involving North Korean athletes, and documentaries and programs about the history of sports in North Korea and the world. The channel broadcasts on Saturdays and Sundays from 19:00 to 22:00.

Pyongyang TV Tower
Frequency plan of Pyongyang TV Tower (2015) and the Manbang IPTV channels (2016). The VHF channels utilize System D and the UHF frequencies are System K.

Content
The quality of programming has improved over the years. International news is broadcast and the quality of educational programming is high. Documentaries are aired often and are usually on the topic of health, Korean and world history and geography. Since 2012, weather forecasting has become more accurate and timely responding to climate change concerns and the economic impact of weather events.

See also

List of North Korean television series
Telecommunications in North Korea
Media of North Korea
Television in South Korea

References

Sources 
 Review of television and radio broadcasting in North and South Korea